Acrocercops ochroptila is a moth of the family Gracillariidae. It is known from Queensland and the Northern Territory, Australia.

The larvae feed on Terminalia catappa. They probably mine the leaves of their host plant.

References

ochroptila
Moths of Australia
Moths described in 1913